The 11th Parliament of Solomon Islands is the current sitting of the National Parliament of Solomon Islands. They were elected in the 2019 Solomon Islands general election.

Members

Changes 
Ethel Lency Vokia won a by-election in 2020 to replace her husband Jaimie Vokia in the North East Guadalcanal constituency.

See also 

 8th Parliament of Solomon Islands (2006–2010)
 9th Parliament of Solomon Islands (2010–2014)
 10th Parliament of Solomon Islands (2014–2019)

References 

National Parliament of the Solomon Islands
Solomon Islands
National Parliament of the Solomon Islands